This is a timeline of the history of piracy.
Piracy in ancient history
Piracy in post-classical history
1560s
1570s
1580s
1590s
1600s
1610s
1620s
1630s
1640s
1650s
1660s
1670s
1680s
1690s: 1690 – 1691 – 1692 – 1693 – 1694 – 1695 – 1696 – 1697 – 1698 – 1699
1700s: 1700 – 1701 – 1702 – 1703 – 1704 – 1705 – 1706 – 1707 – 1708 – 1709
1710s: 1710 – 1711 – 1712 – 1713 – 1714 – 1715 – 1716 – 1717 – 1718 – 1719
1720s: 1720 – 1721 – 1722 – 1723 – 1724 – 1725 – 1726 – 1727 – 1728 – 1729
1730s: 1730 – 1731 – 1732 – 1733 – 1734 – 1735 – 1736 – 1737 – 1738 – 1739
1740s: 1740 – 1741 – 1742 – 1743 – 1744 – 1745 – 1746 – 1747 – 1748 – 1749
1750s: 1750 – 1751 – 1752 – 1753 – 1754 – 1755 – 1756 – 1757 – 1758 – 1759
1760s: 1760 – 1761 – 1762 – 1763 – 1764 – 1765 – 1766 – 1767 – 1768 – 1769
1770s: 1770 – 1771 – 1772 – 1773 – 1774 – 1775 – 1776 – 1777 – 1778 – 1779
1780s: 1780 – 1781 – 1782 – 1783 – 1784 – 1785 – 1786 – 1787 – 1788 – 1789
1790s: 1790 – 1791 – 1792 – 1793 – 1794 – 1795 – 1796 – 1797 – 1798 – 1799
1800s: 1800 – 1801 – 1802 – 1803 – 1804 – 1805 – 1806 – 1807 – 1808 – 1809
1810s: 1810 – 1811 – 1812 – 1813 – 1814 – 1815 – 1816 – 1817 – 1818 – 1819
1820s: 1820 – 1821 – 1822 – 1823 – 1824 – 1825 – 1826 – 1827 – 1828 – 1829
1830s: 1830 – 1831 – 1832 – 1833 – 1834 – 1835 – 1836 - 1837 – 1838 – 1839
1840s: 1840 – 1841 – 1842 – 1843 – 1844 – 1845 – 1846 – 1847 – 1848 – 1849
1850s: 1850 – 1851 – 1852 – 1853 – 1854 – 1855 – 1856 – 1857 – 1858 – 1859
1860s: 1860 – 1861 – 1862 – 1863 – 1864 – 1865 – 1866 – 1867 – 1868 – 1869
1870s: 1870 – 1871 – 1872 – 1873 – 1874 – 1875 – 1876 – 1877 – 1878 – 1879
1880s: 1880 – 1881 – 1882 – 1883 – 1884 – 1885 – 1886 – 1887 – 1888 – 1889
1890s: 1890 – 1891 – 1892 – 1893 – 1894 – 1895 – 1896 – 1897 – 1898 – 1899
1900s: 1900 – 1901 – 1902 – 1903 – 1904 – 1905 – 1906 – 1907 – 1908 – 1909
1910s: 1910 – 1911 – 1912 – 1913 – 1914 – 1915 – 1916 – 1917 – 1918 – 1919
1920s: 1920 – 1921 – 1922 – 1923 – 1924 – 1925 – 1926 – 1927 – 1928 – 1929
1930s: 1930 – 1931 – 1932 – 1933 – 1934 – 1935 – 1936 – 1937 – 1938 – 1939
1940s: 1940 – 1941 – 1942 – 1943 – 1944 – 1945 – 1946 – 1947 – 1948 – 1949
1950s: 1950 – 1951 – 1952 – 1953 – 1954 – 1955 – 1956 – 1957 – 1958 – 1959
1960s: 1960 – 1961 – 1962 – 1963 – 1964 – 1965 – 1966 – 1967 – 1968 – 1969
1970s: 1970 – 1971 – 1972 – 1973 – 1974 – 1975 – 1976 – 1977 – 1978 – 1979
1980s: 1980 – 1981 – 1982 – 1983 – 1984 – 1985 – 1986 – 1987 – 1988 – 1989
1990s: 1990 – 1991 – 1992 – 1993 – 1994 – 1995 – 1996 – 1997 – 1998 – 1999
2000s: 2000 – 2001 – 2002 – 2003 – 2004 – 2005 – 2006 – 2007 – 2008 – 2009
2010s: 2010 – 2011 – 2012 – 2013 – 2014 – 2015 – 2016 – 2017

Piracy by year
Piracy lists
Piracy
Piracy